Neli Lifuka was born in 1909 on Vaitupu, he worked as a marine engineer  and from 1945 to 1951 he was the magistrate on Vaitupu. He organised the collection of the funds necessary to purchase Kioa island in Fiji in 1946 and in 1956 he joined the Kioa community and became the chairman of the council.

Early life
Neli Lifuka was educated at Elisefou school, which were turbulent years as he was in conflict with Donald Gilbert Kennedy, the headmaster.

He gained employment on freighters and on the phosphate boats that worked at Banaba Island (Ocean Island). He was promoted to be an engineer. He also work on a government boat and a missionary vessel; with each of these jobs he resigned after arguing with his commanding officers over pay and conditions.

Kennedy, who in 1932 became the resident District Officer at Funafuti for the Gilbert and Ellice Islands Colony, gave him work blasting reef passages.  He was given a job on Ocean Island as a hospital dresser and as the Ellice community liaison person.  He ended up leading a strike of Ellice Island workers against the British Phosphate Commission.

World War II
During the Pacific War Neli Lifuka was on Vaitupu working as a Coastwatcher to identify any Japanese activity.

He was later engaged in organising Tuvaluans to work at Funafuti on building the American base and unloading ships.

Post-War years
After World War II Kennedy encouraged Neli Lifuka in the resettlement proposal that resulted in the purchase of Kioa island in Fiji in 1946. Neli Lifuka organised the collection of the funds to purchase Kioa. Initially 37 people  migrated from Vaitupu  to live on Kioa Island; within a decade, more than 235 people followed.

In June 1945 Neli Lifuka was appointed the magistrate on Vaitupu.  He alienated Colonial administrators for not strictly enforcing laws. He also alienated some of the elders because of his comparative young age to be person in authority in the Vaitupuan community. He resigned in 1951 after being caught in flagrante delicto with the pastor’s wife. Thereafter he worked for the Colony Cooperative Society and again worked on an inter-island vessel.

In 1956, he joined the Kioa community and became the chairman of its council.

References

1909 births
People from Vaitupu
1980 deaths